Alfred Hermann Fried (11 November 1864 – 4 May 1921) was an Austrian Jewish pacifist, publicist, journalist, co-founder of the German peace movement, and winner (with Tobias Asser) of the Nobel Peace Prize in 1911. Fried was also a supporter of Esperanto. He is the author of an Esperanto textbook and an Esperanto-German and German-Esperanto dictionary, first published in 1903 and republished in 1905.

Life 

Born in Vienna, Austria-Hungary, to a Jewish family, Fried left school at the age of 15 and started to work in a bookshop. In 1883 he moved to Berlin, where he opened a bookshop of his own in 1887. Following the publication by Bertha von Suttner of Die Waffen nieder! (Lay Down Your Arms) in 1889, he and von Suttner began in 1892 to print a magazine of the same name. In articles published within Die Waffen nieder! and its successor, Die Friedenswarte (The Peace Watch), he articulated his pacifist philosophy.

In 1892 he was a co-founder of the German Peace Society (Deutsche Friedensgesellschaft). He was one of the fathers of the idea of a modern organisation to assure worldwide peace (the principal idea was developed in the League of Nations and after the Second World War in the UN).

Fried was a prominent member of the Esperanto movement. In 1903 he published the book Lehrbuch der internationalen Hilfssprache Esperanto (Textbook of the International Language Esperanto).

In 1909 he collaborated with Paul Otlet and Henri La Fontaine of the Central Office of International Associations in the preparation of the Annuaire de la Vie Internationale.

In 1911 he received the Nobel Peace Prize together with Tobias Asser.

During World War I, Fried moved to neutral Switzerland, and continued to advocate international peace. He died in his hometown, Vienna, in 1921. His ashes are buried at Feuerhalle Simmering.

Work 
Das Abrüstungs-Problem: Eine Untersuchung. Berlin, Gutman, 1904.
Abschied von Wien
The German Emperor and the Peace of the World, with a Preface by Norman Angell. London, Hodder & Stoughton, 1912.
Die Grundlagen des revolutionären Pacifismus. Tübingen, Mohr, 1908. Translated into French by Jean Lagorgette as Les Bases du pacifisme: Le Pacifisme réformiste et le pacifisme «révolutionnaire». Paris, Pedone, 1909.
Handbuch der Friedensbewegung. (Handbook of the Peace Movement) Wien, Oesterreichische Friedensgesellschaft, 1905. 2nd ed., Leipzig, Verlag der «Friedens-Warte», 1911.
«Intellectual Starvation in Germany and Austria», in Nation, 110 (March 20, 1920) 367–368.
International Cooperation. Newcastle upon Tyne, Richardson [1918].
Das internationale Leben der Gegenwart. Leipzig, Teubner, 1908.
«The League of Nations: An Ethical Institution», in Living Age, 306 (August 21, 1920) 440–443.
Mein Kriegstagebuch. (My War Journal) 4 Bde. Zürich, Rascher, 1918–1920.
Pan-Amerika. Zürich, Orell-Füssli, 1910.
The Restoration of Europe, transl. by Lewis Stiles Gannett. New York, Macmillan, 1916.
Der Weltprotest gegen den versailler Frieden. Leipzig, Verlag der Neue Geist, 1920.
Die zweite Haager Konferenz: Ihre Arbeiten, ihre Ergebnisse, und ihre Bedeutung. Leipzig, Nachfolger [1908].

Esperanto textbook and vocabulary 
 Wörterbuch Esperanto-Deutsch und Deutsch-Esperanto 
 Lehrbuch der internationalen Hilfssprache “Esperanto” mit Wörterbuch in Esperanto-Deutsch und Deutsch-Esperanto, Berlin-Schönberg: Esperanto-Verlag, 1903 pr. Pass & Garleb, Berlin 18x12cm II, 120p. 
2nd edition: Stuttgart: Franckhsche Verlagshandlung, 1905 18x12cm 91, 5p.
3rd edition: Stuttgart: Franckhsche Verlagshandlung, 1905 18x12cm 91p.

See also
List of Jewish Nobel laureates
List of peace activists
List of Austrian Jews
List of Austrian writers
List of Austrians

References

 Roger Chickering: Imperial Germany and A World Without War : The Peace Movement and German Society, 1892–1914. Princeton University Press, Princeton 1975, .
 Walter Göhring: Verdrängt und Vergessen – Friedensnobelpreisträger. Alfred Hermann Fried. Kremayr & Scheriau, Wien 2006, 
 Bernhard Kupfer: Lexikon der Nobelpreisträger. Patmos, Düsseldorf 2001, 
 Petra Schönemann-Behrens: „Organisiert die Welt“. Leben und Werk des Friedensnobelpreisträgers Alfred Hermann Fried (1864–1921). Dissertation, Universität Bremen 2004.
 Bernhard Tuider: Alfred Hermann Fried. Pazifist im Ersten Weltkrieg – Illusion und Vision. VDM, Saarbrücken 2010, 
About Alfred Hermann Fried
Alfred Hermann Fried (November 11, 1864 – May 5, 1921) ( ( 2009-10-25)

1864 births
1921 deaths
Nobel Peace Prize laureates
Austrian Nobel laureates
Austro-Hungarian Nobel laureates
Journalists from Vienna
Austrian Jews
Austrian pacifists
German Peace Society members
Jewish pacifists
Jewish peace activists
Esperanto speaking Jews
Austrian Esperantists
Burials at Feuerhalle Simmering